Helena Radziwiłłowa (1753-1821) was a Polish aristocrat.

She was, for a period, a lady-in-waiting to Catherine the Great. She married the Polish magnate and politician Michał Hieronim Radziwiłł in 1771. She was widely known for her love affairs and was the lover of Stanisław August Poniatowski as well as of Otto Magnus von Stackelberg (ambassador), who benefitted the career of her spouse.

References

1753 births
1821 deaths
Mistresses of Stanisław August Poniatowski
18th-century Polish women
Ladies-in-waiting from the Russian Empire